The Artisan is a boutique hotel in Las Vegas, Nevada. Its 64 rooms are decorated with eclectic art and reproductions of famous paintings.

History
The hotel opened in 1979 as a Travelodge.

Doug DaSilva purchased the hotel in late 2001 and renamed and overhauled it as The Artisan. Works by artists such as Cézanne, Chagall, Da Vinci, Rembrandt, Renoir, and Van Gogh were placed all over the property. By 2004, DaSilva stated that he had spent $4 million on renovations.

DaSilva experimented with entertainment options including rock music and murder mystery dinner theater, before settling on a lineup of jazz music centered on weekly appearances by keyboardist Ronnie Foster.
 
DaSilva planned for The Artisan to be the first of a chain of hotels, with locations to be opened in El Paso, Memphis, and Spokane.

In 2008, Las Vegas CityLife named the Artisan lounge as the best bar in Las Vegas.

Even though the property received good reviews and had a loyal clientele, it faced cash flow and maintenance problems, and entered Chapter 11 bankruptcy protection in December 2008. DaSilva claimed that the bankruptcy was intended only to allow the cancellation of a contract with a hotel reservation network, so that the property could join the Ascend Collection, a high-end hotel brand created by Choice Hotels International. A year later, however, the Artisan was still in bankruptcy, and it agreed to allow its mortgageholder, an affiliate of The Siegel Group, to foreclose. The Siegel Group closed its acquisition of the property in January 2010, and began working to correct the outstanding issues.

Siegel performed at least $1 million in renovations, and revamped the entertainment lineup to appeal to a broader range of local residents. In May 2010, The Artisan started holding themed invite-only pool parties. The Artisan also gained note for marketing a "buyout" option, allowing a patron to rent the entire property. In 2015, the Siegel Group briefly listed the hotel for sale for $4.6 million, before deciding instead to undertake another $1-million renovation.

In 2022, the Phoenix-based Pro Hospitality Group purchased the Artisan from the Siegel Group for $11.9 million. Pro Hospitality said that it would spend $3 million to renovate the Artisan, and hoped to make the property "cannabis-friendly".

In media
The Artisan was featured on a 2007 episode of the A&E TV show Criss Angel Mindfreak. It has also appeared on the Cinemax series Sin City Diaries.

In 2010, Kourtney Kardashian and boyfriend Scott Disick celebrated Disick's birthday at the Artisan in an episode of the reality series Keeping Up with the Kardashians.

References

External links
 The Artisan

Hotels in Las Vegas
Hotels established in 1979
Hotel buildings completed in 1979
1979 establishments in Nevada